The Philosopher Kings is the debut album from Canadian R&B musicians The Philosopher Kings, released in 1994.

The album earned the group a Juno Award nomination for Best R&B/Soul Recording of the Year.

Track listing
 "Turn My Head Around" (3:59)
 "Lay My Body Down" (4:41)
 "All Dressed Up for San Francisco" (4:31)
 "Can't Get My Mind Around You" (4:31)
 "All to Myself" (4:28)
 "Leave That Man" (6:30)
 "Do You Swear" (3:42)
 "Everyone'll Let You Down" (4:30)
 "Just Like a Woman" (4:13)
 "Charms" (4:47)
 "Fingernails to Claws" (4:49)
 "No Woman Around" (3:40)

 Track 9 is a Bob Dylan cover.

Personnel
Gerald Eaton - lead and backup vocals
James McCollum - guitar, guitar solos, acoustic guitar on "No Woman Around"
Brian West - guitar, guitar treatments, guitar synth bass on "Everyone'll Let You Down"
Jon Levine - piano, keyboards, organ, backup vocals, toy bells
Jason Levine - double and electric bass, backup vocals
Craig Hunter - drums, percussion, backup vocals

Special Guests:
Keita Hopkinson - backup vocals on "Fingernails to Claws"
Terence Blanchard - trumpet on "Lay My Body Down"
Bobby Watson - alto saxophone on "Do You Swear"

The Philosopher Kings albums
1994 debut albums
Columbia Records albums